Nancy Sexton (born July 8, 1969 in Ragersville, Ohio), is an American filmmaker, singer-songwriter, model and TV personality.

Life
In 2005, she started on FitTV's hit show, "The Gym".

Her song, "It's a real World", produced by DJ  reached number one on the Italian Hit Parade, and led to her 1997 performance in Festivalbar.

Since 2006, she is the CEO and co-owner with Alon Bar of 4881 LLC, a multifaceted platform, serving as a launch pad for creativity. Amongst others, the collaboration between Sexton and Bar created the award-winning screenplay "Type O," Scriptapalooza and the animation feature "Ruby", both currently (2017) in pre-production.

In 2011, she co-authored with Alon Bar the book Write Your Film, a screenwriting manual exploring the two unique writing system and collaboration.

Films in production
Ruby (working title) (2017), Producer: Lumiq Studios, Turin, Italy

Awards
2010 Quarterfinalist at the Scriptapalooza screenwriting competition, USA, for "Type O"
2013 Quarterfinalist at the ScreenCraft Comedy Script Contest, USA, for "Sweethearts"

Other work
''Write Your Film (book) (2011)

Gallery

References

External links
 

1969 births
Living people
People from Tuscarawas County, Ohio
American filmmakers
American female models
American television personalities
American women television personalities
Singer-songwriters from Ohio
21st-century American women